Football is a 1986 video game published by Sublogic.

Gameplay
Football is a game in which two teams consisting of fictional players are included, and the ratings of these players can be adjusted.

Reception
Rick Teverbaugh reviewed the game for Computer Gaming World, and stated that "The cleverly titled Football, from subLogic, is a nice enough game. The game system is much easier to implement than many recent efforts, but the graphics are only average (detail of the field is missing)."

Roy Wagner reviewed the game for Computer Gaming World, and stated that "I was disappointed in seeing this game turn out to be not as good a simulation as I expected. Perhaps it was because after such great flying simulations, I expected too much when my feet were back on the ground."

References

External links
Review in Ahoy!

1986 video games
American football video games
Commodore 64 games
DOS games
Video games developed in the United States